By the Time I Get to Phoenix is an album by Marty Robbins, produced by Bob Johnston and arranged by Robert Mersey. It was released in May 1968 by CBS Records. It reached #8 on the US Country Chart. The song 'Virginia' was released as a single in 1969.

Track listing 

 "By the Time I Get to Phoenix" (Jimmy Webb)
 "Am I That Easy to Forget" (Carl Belew/W.S Stevenson)
 "Love Is Blue" (André Popp/Brian Blackburn/Pierre Cour)
 "Virginia" (Marty Robbins)
 "Until We Meet Again" (Robbins/Robert Mersey)
 "Yesterday" (John Lennon/Paul McCartney)
 "Love Is in the Air" (Robbins)
 "As Time Goes By" (Herman Hupfeld)
 "That Old Feeling" (Lew Brown/Sammy Fain)
 "To Be in Love with Her" (Robbins)
 "You Made Me Love You" (James V. Monaco/Joseph McCarthy)

References

Marty Robbins albums
1968 albums